Bandheri is a town, near Dhar city in Dhar district of Madhya Pradesh, India.

Geography

Location
National Highway 59 passes through Bandheri. It is at a distance of 25 km from Dhar. The nearest airport is Devi Ahilyabai Holkar Airport at Indore.

Places of interest
 Sardarpur Sanctuary
 Darwazas
 Bagh Caves
 Bagh Print

References

External links
 About Bandheri
 Satellite map of Bandheri

Cities and towns in Dhar district